Hoplostethus abramovi is a slimehead belonging to the family Trachichthyidae.

References

External links
 

abramovi
Fish described in 1986
Fish of the Indian Ocean